Pashofa, or pishofa, is a Chickasaw and Choctaw Indian soupy dish made from cracked white corn, also known as pearl hominy. The dish is one of the most important to the Chickasaw people and has been served at ceremonial and social events for centuries. Pashofa is also used in specific healing ceremonies.

Preparation and serving
Traditionally, dried corn was ground in a mortar into cornmeal and cooked in a pot with water. Finely cut pieces of young piglet or calf meat was added. The dish was served cold and could keep up to a month.

The hominy corn can be soaked and cleaned overnight or can be covered with hot water to remove the husks. After draining and removal of debris, the hominy is once again covered with water, salt is added, and the pashofa is cooked over a low heat for many hours. Bacon and pork can be added.

Specialized paddles and spoons, carved from wood or animal horns, were used in stirring, serving, and eating pashofa. Several of these are currently in the collection of the Smithsonian Institution. Pashofa was cooked in giant bowls, often over an open fire outdoors.

Pashofa Dance
The Pashofa Dance is a healing ceremony among the Chickasaw and Choctaw. A sick person could be left in a room, alone except for a medicine man. A striped black and white pole is placed in the sick person's yard, and no one else walks past the pole. While the medicine man says a medicinal formula over the sick person to drive out the "Spirit of Disease called Shulop," others dance outside. Midday, pashofa is served to all the dancers, while it is still warm, along with water to drink. A second round of dancing ensues. Pashofa dances have also been performed indoors.

See also

 List of maize dishes

Notes

References
 Fitzgerald, David, Jeannie Barbour, Amanda Cobb, and Linda Hogan. Chickasaw: Unconquered and Unconquerable. Oklahoma City: Graphic Arts Center Publishing Company, 2006. .
 Crossett, G. A. "A Vanishing Race." Chronicles of Oklahoma. Vol. 4, No. 1, June 1926.

Chickasaw
Choctaw culture
Maize dishes
Native American cuisine
Native American cuisine of the Southeastern Woodlands